The 1978 Monte Carlo Open was a men's tennis tournament played on outdoor clay courts at the Monte Carlo Country Club in Roquebrune-Cap-Martin, France. The tournament was part of the WCT Tour, which was incorporated into the 1978 Colgate-Palmolive Grand Prix circuit. It was the 72nd edition of the event and was held from 10 April through 16 April 1978. Raúl Ramírez, the no. 5 seed, won the singles title.

Finals

Singles
 Raúl Ramírez defeated  Tomáš Šmíd 6–3, 6–3, 6–4
 It was Ramírez' 2nd singles title of the year and the 15th of his career.

Doubles
 Peter Fleming /  Tomáš Šmíd defeated  Jaime Fillol /  Ilie Năstase 6–4, 7–5

References

External links
 
 ATP tournament profile
 ITF tournament details

Monte Carlo Open
Monte-Carlo Masters
Monte Carlo WCT
Monte
Monte Carlo WCT